The Communauté de communes Terre d'eau is an administrative association of rural communes in the Vosges department of eastern France. It was created on 1 January 2017 by the merger of the former Communauté de communes de Bulgnéville entre Xaintois et Bassigny, Communauté de communes de Vittel-Contrexéville and the commune Thuillières. It consists of 45 communes, and has its administrative offices at Bulgnéville. Its area is 415.2 km2, and its population was 17,536 in 2019.

Composition
The communauté de communes consists of the following 45 communes:

Aingeville
Aulnois
Auzainvilliers
Bazoilles-et-Ménil
Beaufremont
Belmont-sur-Vair
Bulgnéville
Contrexéville
Crainvilliers
Dombrot-sur-Vair
Domèvre-sous-Montfort
Domjulien
Estrennes
Gemmelaincourt
Gendreville
Hagnéville-et-Roncourt
Haréville
Houécourt
Malaincourt
Mandres-sur-Vair
Médonville
Monthureux-le-Sec
Morville
La Neuveville-sous-Montfort
Norroy
Offroicourt
Parey-sous-Montfort
Remoncourt
Rozerotte
Saint-Ouen-lès-Parey
Saint-Remimont
Sandaucourt
Saulxures-lès-Bulgnéville
Sauville
Suriauville
They-sous-Montfort
Thuillières
Urville
La Vacheresse-et-la-Rouillie
Valfroicourt
Valleroy-le-Sec
Vaudoncourt
Vittel
Viviers-lès-Offroicourt
Vrécourt

References

Terre d'eau
Terre d'eau